Dane Dominic Currency (born 4 February 1985) is a Barbadian cricketer who has represented the Barbados national team in West Indian domestic cricket. A left-arm orthodox spin bowler, he made his List A debut in January 2016, playing against Jamaica in the 2015–16 Regional Super50.

References

External links
Player profile and statistics at ESPNcricinfo

1995 births
Living people
Barbadian cricketers
Barbados cricketers